José Vladimir Canova Hernández (born 30 September 1992) commonly known as José Canova, is a Peruvian footballer who plays as a centre back for Alianza Universidad in the Peruvian Primera División.

Club career
José Canova began playing for local side Club Frontera de Pisco from 2006 to 2009. Then in 2010 he joined Alianza Lima.    
Canova made his league debut in the Torneo Descentralizado in the last round of the 2011 season at home to Sport Boys. He played as a starter at right back and lasted until the 62nd minute in side's 3–0 win over Boys. That was his only game of the 2011 season.

International career
Canova was called up to play his first match for the Peru national team on 13 August 2012 in an upcoming friendly.

References

External links

1992 births
Living people
People from Pisco, Peru
Peruvian footballers
Club Alianza Lima footballers
Club Deportivo Universidad de San Martín de Porres players
Club Deportivo Universidad César Vallejo footballers
Sport Rosario footballers
Alianza Universidad footballers
Peruvian Primera División players
Association football central defenders